Voss Creek is a stream in Franklin County in the U.S. state of Missouri. It is a tributary of the Bourbeuse River.

Voss Creek most likely was named after Dietrich Voss, the proprietor of a local mill.

See also
List of rivers of Missouri

References

Rivers of Franklin County, Missouri
Rivers of Missouri